Six Strings and a Sailboat is the debut studio album by New Zealand singer-songwriter Jamie McDell. It was released 16 November 2012 and peaked at number 8 on the New Zealand Album Charts. An instrumental version of the album was released on 11 January 2013 on the iTunes Store.

Singles
 "You'll Never Take That Away" was released 20 February 2010. It peaked at number 11 on the New Zealand singles chart.
 "Rewind" was released 18 July 2011. It peaked at number 30 on the New Zealand singles Chart.
 "Life in Sunshine" was released 12 October 2012. It peaked at number 27 on the New Zealand singles Chart.
 "Angel" was released 1 February 2013.

Track listing

Chart performance

Charts

References

2012 debut albums
Jamie McDell albums